Andrew Lofthouse (born 1962 or 1963) is a television and radio newsreader based in Brisbane, Australia. The former teacher is the weeknight presenter of Nine News Queensland with Melissa Downes, having previously presented on weekends. Prior to working at Nine News, he presented the weekday evening news bulletin of ABC News Queensland, as well as reading the news on the 612 ABC Brisbane radio station on weekday afternoons. 

Lofthouse started his broadcasting career at a community radio station on the Gold Coast and began working for ABC Radio (in Rockhampton) in 1990. He moved to ABC Radio Brisbane (then called 612 4QR, now 612 ABC Brisbane) at the end of 1993. In 2003, he began working on ABC television (whilst also reading ABC Radio news bulletins).

In 2003 Andrew Lofthouse was named the 2003 "Queensland TV Personality of the Year" in an online poll conducted by 612 ABC Brisbane.

Lofthouse is also a musician with the alternative rock band Let's Go Naked which has appeared in concerts in Brisbane and recently released an album, Insides.

In November 2008, Lofthouse departed from ABC News, and joined the Nine News Queensland team from early 2009 as presenter of the weekend news bulletin, replacing Melissa Downes who moved to weeknight presenting. He presented his last ABC News bulletin on 28 November 2008. From 2009, Lofthouse began presenting on weekends with Eva Milic.

In June 2009, Lofthouse took over from Bruce Paige as weeknight presenter of Nine News Queensland, joining Downes on the desk. After several years in the ratings wilderness, together they would take the bulletin back to the top of the local ratings by 2013.

References

Australian musicians
ABC News (Australia) presenters
Nine News presenters
Australian radio personalities
Living people
People from Brisbane
Year of birth uncertain
1960s births